Taymylyr is a rural locality (a selo) and the administrative center of Tyumetinsky Rural Okrug of Bulunsky District in the Sakha Republic, Russia, located  from Tiksi, the administrative center of the district. Its population as of the 2010 Census was 757, down from 900 recorded during the 2002 Census.

Geography
Taymylyr lies north of the Arctic Circle, on the left bank of the Olenyok River, downstream of its confluence with the Kelimyar. The nearest settlement is Ust-Olenyok located further downriver.

Demographics
According to the 2010 Census, the vast majority of the rural okrug's population was composed of indigenous Siberian peoples, with Evenks making up 48%, and Evens and Yakuts around 22% each.

Economy and infrastructure
The local economy is based on reindeer herding, hunting, and fishing.

Climate
Taymylyr lies on the July 10°C isotherm and has a tundra climate (ET) closely bordering on a subarctic climate (Dfc).

References

Notes

Sources
Official website of the Sakha Republic. Registry of the Administrative-Territorial Divisions of the Sakha Republic. Bulunsky District. 

Rural localities in Bulunsky District
Olenyok basin